The Women's team foil event took place on November 10, 2010 at Grand Palais.

Foil team

References

External links
 Bracket

2010 World Fencing Championships
World